Elymus may refer to:
 Elymus (plant), a genus of grasses
 Elymus (mythology), the mythical ancestor of the Elymians
 A man killed by Gorge (mythology)